Timelkam is a municipality in the district of Vöcklabruck in the Austrian state of Upper Austria.

Infrastructure
The Timelkam power plant consisting of four units is present on the locality territory.

The most recent part is a 400 MW combined cycle gas unit that was commissioned in 2009.
It was planned to cause the immediate shut down of the old 66 MW coal unit, as well as an older gas unit, however low 2013 coal price have led instead to the decision of mothballing it soon after completion.

In 2006, a 15MW biomass unit has also been commissioned, and supplies a heating network.

References

Cities and towns in Vöcklabruck District